Commatarcha vaga is a moth in the Carposinidae family. It was described by Alexey Diakonoff in 1989. It is found in Japan.

References

Natural History Museum Lepidoptera generic names catalog

Carposinidae
Moths described in 1989